Jobst is a name.

People with first name Jobst:
 Jobst of Moravia
 Jobst Oetzmann
 Jobst Brandt
 Jobst Fricke
 Jobst Wagner
 Jobst Nikolaus I, Count of Hohenzollern
 Jobst II, Count of Hoya
 Jobst Harrich
 Jobst Kuch
 Friedrich-Jobst Volckamer von Kirchensittenbach
 Jobst I, Count of Hoya
 Jobst Burgi
 Jobst Herman, Count of Schaumburg
 Jobst Herman, Count of Lippe
 Jobst of Limburg
 Jobst Oetzmann
 Jobst Bernhard von Aufsees
 Jobst Hirscht
 Jobst I, Count of Holstein-Schauenburg
 Jobst Amman

People with last name Jobst:
 Arnold Jobst, Count of Bentheim and Steinfurt
 Herbert Jobst, German writer (1915–1990)
 John Jobst, German clergyman (1920–2014)
 Jola Jobst, German actress (1915–1952)
 Karl Jobst, Australian speedrunner, YouTuber, and journalist
 Kerstin Susanne Jobst, German historian and professor
 Mason Jobst, American ice hockey player (b. 1994)
 Rolf Jobst, German rower (b. 1951)
 Wolf Jobst Siedler, German publisher (1926–2013)
 Wolfgang Jobst, Australian sports shooter (b. 1956)